HMS Tiger was a Dutch hoy that the Admiralty purchased in 1794. She was commissioned into the Royal Navy in April 1794 under Lieutenant Joseph Withers for the Channel Islands. She and several of her sister ships (and ), formed part of a short-lived squadron under Philippe d'Auvergne at Jersey. 

She was paid off in December 1795 and sold in 1798.

Citations and references
Citations

References
 

Hoys of the Royal Navy
1790s ships